René Girard (born 4 April 1954) is a French football manager and former player.

Early life
Girard was born in Vauvert, Gard.

Playing career
Girard won seven caps, scoring one goal for France and was a member of the squad that finished fourth at the 1982 World Cup. At club level, while playing for Bordeaux, Girard won three Ligue 1 titles – in 1983–84, 1984–85 and 1986–87, as well as two Coupes de France, over Marseille in the 1986 and 1987 editions.

Coaching career
Girard managed Nîmes, Strasbourg, Pau FC and multiple France youth teams. He coached the France national under-21 team from 2004–2008.

On 3 June 2009, he became the new head coach of Montpellier HSC, replacing Rolland Courbis. In the 2011–12 season, Montpellier shocked the footballing world by winning its first Ligue 1 title, finishing the season with 82 points, three more than runner-up Paris Saint-Germain. He said after his team won it. "I think our triumph is a real shot in the arm for French football. "It just goes to show that everyone can beat everyone and that money isn't the be-all and end-all. We're a club of mates, a club that brings young players through and gives them a chance. "At the end of the day, it's worked out well for us. We played some great football, with a well-balanced team and I'm overwhelmed."

He signed for Lille in July 2013, replacing Rudi Garcia who left for Roma.

On 30 September 2018, he was appointed as the head coach of Moroccan club Wydad AC.

Honours

Player
Bordeaux
Division 1: 1983–84, 1984–85, 1986–87
Coupe de France: 1985–86, 1986–87
Challenge des Champions: 1986

Manager
Montpellier
Ligue 1: 2011–12

References

External links

 
 
 Profile at www.pari-et-gagne.com

1954 births
Living people
Sportspeople from Gard
French footballers
Association football midfielders
Nîmes Olympique players
FC Girondins de Bordeaux players
Ligue 1 players
Ligue 2 players
France international footballers
1982 FIFA World Cup players
French football managers
Nîmes Olympique managers
Pau FC managers
RC Strasbourg Alsace managers
France national under-21 football team managers
Montpellier HSC managers
Lille OSC managers
FC Nantes managers
Wydad AC managers
Paris FC managers
Ligue 1 managers
Ligue 2 managers
French expatriate football managers
Expatriate football managers in Morocco
French expatriate sportspeople in Morocco